Butrimas (Polonized form: Bytrym) is a noble surname of Polish–Lithuanian Commonwealth belonging to the Topor heraldic clan. The Russified version is Butrim. The derived surname is Butrymowicz, literally meaning "descendant of Butrym".

The Bitrym, Butrim or Butrimas may refer to:

Vitaliy Butrym, Ukrainian sprinter
Józwa Butrym, a fictional character from the novel The Deluge by Sienkiewicz

Lithuanian-language surnames